Bolshoye Morskoye or Mainychin Ankavatyn (Maynıçın-Ankavatın) is a freshwater lake in the Sakha Republic (Yakutia), Russia.

Lying in the tundra of northeastern Yakutia, it is the fourth largest lake in the republic. A  sector of the lake and its surroundings is a protected area.

Geography
Bolshoye Morskoye, meaning "Big Sea", lies way north of the Arctic circle, in the northern part of the Kolyma Lowland. The lake has a roughly oval shape and is located in a vast, flat area of lakes bound by the East Siberian Sea shores to the north and to the east. It belongs to the basin of the Bolshaya Chukochya river, which flows close to the lake to the south. The depth of Bolshoye Morskoye has not been measured. The lake is fed by snow and rain, with a predominance of snow. It begins to freeze in late September and stays under ice until early June. In cold years it may not thaw completely during the summer season.

Flora and fauna
The Bolshoye Morskoye lake lies in an area of permafrost and wetlands. Its shores are low, slightly indented, and covered with moss, lichen and low herbaceous vegetation. Reindeer are found in the area. The lake is rich in fish. Among the migratory bird species found in the lake in summer, the tundra swan, brent goose, black-billed capercaillie, peregrine falcon, loon and snow goose deserve mention.

See also
List of lakes of Russia

References

External links
Fishing & Tourism in Yakutia

Lakes of the Sakha Republic
East Siberian Lowland